Sha'ab (meaning "The spur") is an Arab town and local council in the Northern District of Israel. It has an area of 5,442 dunams of land under its jurisdiction.

History 
French scholar Victor Guérin associated Sha'ab with Saab, a place mentioned by 1st-century Jewish historian Josephus. The Midrash Rabba (Leviticus Rabba s. 20) mentions a certain Rabbi Mani of Sha'ab. In the 14th century, the tax income from the village was given to the wakf of the madrasah and mausoleum of the Shafi'i Manjaq in Egypt.

Ottoman era
In 1517, Sha'ab was incorporated into the Ottoman Empire along with the rest of Palestine. In 1573 (981 AH) Sha'ab was one of several villages in Galilee which rebelled against the Ottomans. In 1596, the village appeared in Ottoman tax registers as being in the Nahiya of Acre, part of Safad Sanjak,  with a population of 102 households and 37 bachelors, all Muslims. The villagers  paid a fixed tax rate of 33,3%  on wheat, barley, fruit trees, "goats and bees", in addition to "occasional revenues"; a total of 14,354 akçe. 3/4 of the revenue went to a Waqf.

According to local tradition, the village started to flourish under anti-Ottoman rebel Zahir al-Umar (c. 1768). In 1859, the population was estimated to be 1,500. Some were Catholic, the majority Muslim. The cultivated fields were estimated to be 80 feddans. Guérin visited in the 1870s, and wrote that the village of Sh'aib consisted of four quarters. The inhabitants, he wrote, were for the most part Muslim, about 800, and some 20 "Schismatic Greek" families. The Muslims had two Mosques and two walis. In 1881, Sha'ab was described as being in a valley with fine olive groves, while part of the hill behind it was cultivated in corn.

A population list from about 1887 showed that Sha'ab had about 1,430  inhabitants; 1,345 Muslims and 85 Greek Catholics.

British Mandate era
In the  1922 census of Palestine conducted by the British Mandate authorities, Sha'ab had a population of 1,206; 1,166 Muslims and 40 Christians, where the Christians were 15 Orthodox and 25 Melkites. The population increased slightly in the  1931 census to 1,297;  1,277 Muslims, 19 Christians and 1 Jew, in a total of 284  houses.

During the 1936 revolt in Palestine, the British Army attacked Sha'ab, demolishing 190 houses in the village. According to an eyewitness account, the British collectively punished the village for harboring a rebel who allegedly set off a roadside explosive that killed four British soldiers and injured three. A day prior to the demolition of the homes, the army rounded up around 200 of its adult male residents and led them to a valley outside the village. As they were being lined up, a rebel fighter positioned on a nearby hill began yelling and firing into the air, confusing the soldiers and causing Sha'ab's detained men to disperse chaotically. One resident named Hassan Hajj Khatib was killed.

In the  1945 statistics, Sha'ab had 1,740 inhabitants; 30 Christians and 1,710 Muslims.  They owned a total of 17,870 dunams of land, while 121 dunams were public. 3,248 dunams were used for plantations and irrigable land, 6,602 dunams for cereals, while 231 dunams were built-up (urban) land.

State of Israel
Sha'ab was captured by the Israel Forces (IDF) on 19 July 1948 during the 1948 Arab–Israeli War. The villagers surrendered without a fight, and their village was subsequently depopulated in the Palestinian  expulsions. Still, Sha'ab was found by the IDF's Ninth Brigade still to be inhabited in December 1948, and the residents were expelled on foot. The village was the headquarters and hometown of Abu Is'af, leader of one of the most effective local militias during the war and someone viewed as a hero by many Arabs in the area.

Most of Sha'ab's original residents became internally displaced refugees, settling in nearby Arab villages, predominantly in Majd al-Krum and Sakhnin. Meanwhile, many refugees from the depopulated villages of al-Birwa, al-Damun and Mi'ar were settled in Sha'ab in 1948 and were joined by refugees from Kirad al-Ghannam and Kirad al-Baqqara in the Hula Valley in 1953. The original residents of Sha'ab protested their circumstances and launched a campaign soon after the end of the war to return to their homes. They gained the sympathy of most of the refugees from the Hula Valley and al-Birwa, but faced resistance from the former residents of al-Damun and Mi'ar. By 1950, roughly 10% of Sha'ab's original inhabitants returned to the village and eventually many more were given permission to resettle.

Notable buildings

Mosque of Zahir al-Umar
The mosque of Zahir al-Umar is situated in the centre of the old village. In 1933 it was inspected by Na'im Makhouly from the Palestine Antiquities Museum, who found that the mosque dated from the time of Zahir al-Umar. In 1933 the mosque was in disrepair. Pictures from the time show two arcades: one had four arches connected with the side wall, with two columns in the centre. A reused Ionic capital could be seen, and above the doorway was a reused Roman lintel (first noticed by Guérin in the 1870s).

Andrew Petersen, an archaeologist specialising  in Islamic architecture, surveyed the mosque in 1994. He found that the present mosque, built in the 1980s, encased the old building. The old part is the prayer hall, has an entrance to the north. This hall is square, covered with a dome. The dome rests on large squinches, which are supported by corbels. According to Petersen, the domed prayer hall is consistent with an 18th-century construction date.

Tomb of Shaykh Alami 
The Maqam Shaykh Alami is situated south of the mosque, within its enclosure. It is built at a slope, where the ground rises to the south. On the east side there are two entrances; to the maqam, and to an underground cistern.

The building is rectangular, 10 x 20 m, with an interior divided into two. The southern part contains a mihrab and is covered with a barrel vault. The northern end is covered with a dome, and has two large cenotaphs. According to Petersen, the buildings appear medieval.

See also
Arab localities in Israel
Depopulated Palestinian locations in Israel

References

Bibliography

  
 

  

Heyd, Uriel (1960): Ottoman Documents on Palestine, 1552-1615, Oxford University Press, Oxford. 

MPF: Ipsirli and al-Tamimi (1982): The Muslim Pious Foundations and Real Estates in Palestine. Gazza, Al-Quds al-Sharif, Nablus and Ajlun Districts according to 16th-Century Ottoman Tahrir Registers, Organisation of Islamic Conference, Istanbul 1402/1982. 

 

   ( p. 268)
   p. 257, 279, 305

External links
Official website
Welcome To Sha'ab
Survey of Western Palestine, Map 5:  IAA, Wikimedia commons 

Arab localities in Israel
Local councils in Northern District (Israel)
Ancient Jewish settlements of Galilee